Vyskytná nad Jihlavou) is a municipality and village in Jihlava District in the Vysočina Region of the Czech Republic. It has about 900 inhabitants.

Administrative parts
Villages of Hlávkov, Jiřín and Rounek are administrative parts of Vyskytná nad Jihlavou.

References

Villages in Jihlava District